Glen Duncan is a British author born in 1965 in Bolton, Lancashire,  England to an Anglo-Indian family. He studied philosophy and literature at the universities of Lancaster and Exeter.

In 1990 Duncan moved to London, where he worked as a bookseller for four years, writing in his spare time. In 1994 he visited India with his father (part roots odyssey, part research for a later work, The Bloodstone Papers)  before continuing on to the United States, where he spent several months travelling the country by Amtrak train, writing much of what would become his first novel, Hope, published to critical acclaim on both sides of the Atlantic in 1997.

His novel I, Lucifer was published in 2002. The premise of the book is that Lucifer has been given a month to live in mortal form to get himself back into God's good graces before the end of the world. The film rights have been sold.
The book was provided with a "soundtrack" by Duncan's longtime friend Stephen Coates and his band The Real Tuesday Weld, a cross-platform collaboration repeated for Duncan's book The Last Werewolf. The pair have toured and performed at various live events and festivals together including at the British Film Institute. 

According to critic William Skidelsky in The Observer, Duncan "specialises in writing novels that can't easily be pigeon-holed". Similarly, David Robson in The Daily Telegraph has noted that Duncan is "an idiosyncratic talent", adding,"You never know quite which way he is going to turn."

In 2013, Glen Duncan took the pseudonym of Saul Black to publish a thriller, The Killing Lessons, in 2015.

Bibliography 
 Hope (1997)
 Love Remains (2000)
 I, Lucifer (2002)
 Weathercock (2003)
 Death of an Ordinary Man (2004)
 The Bloodstone Papers (2006)
 A Day And A Night And A Day (2009)
 The Last Werewolf (April 2011)
 Talulla Rising (June 2012)
 By Blood We Live (February 2014)

Valerie Hart series 
Published under the pseudonym Saul Black:

The Killing Lessons (2015)
LoveMurder (2016)
Anything for You (2019)

References

External links
Duncan, Glen (18 November 2007). "Young Man Behaving Badly", New York Times Magazine. Retrieved 10 January 2022.
Malory, Jason (16 November 2004)."Interview with Glen Duncan", Scene Missing. Retrieved 10 January 2022.
Feature on Duncan's novel The Bloodstone Papers, The Times

1965 births
Living people
20th-century English novelists
21st-century English novelists
Alumni of the University of Exeter
Alumni of Lancaster University
British people of Anglo-Indian descent
British writers
English booksellers
English speculative fiction writers
English thriller writers
Writers from Bolton
Postmodern writers